The Bonaparte Basin is a sedimentary basin in Western Australia and the Northern Territory of Australia.

The sedimentary basin emerges at the Joseph Bonaparte Gulf and extends into the ocean in the waters of the gulf and the Timor Sea. It partially overlays the Pine Creek Orogen and the Fitzmaurice Basin. It is bounded on the north by the Timor Trough, on the west by the Browse Basin and on the northeast by the Money Shoals Basin.

The basin originated from the Cambrian period to the Cenozoic era, 540 to 360 million years ago. Limestone, sandstone, mudstone, basalt, coal and glacial sediments are embedded in the basin. It contains several oil and natural gas fields amounting to 18% of Australia's known reserves of natural gas.

The sedimentary basin partially overlays the Kalkaindji province, the Birrindudu Basin and Wolfe Basin.

The Bonaparte Basin has deposits of lead, zinc, iron, gold and smaller coal deposits on land, mineralised in sandstone deposits. There were studies on petroleum and natural gas, which have resulted in oil and gas-producing wells and two undersea pipelines to the Northern Territory.

References

External links 
 Bonaparte Basin Northern Territory government

Sedimentary basins of Australia
Geology of the Northern Territory
Geology of Western Australia